
Gmina Szemud is a rural gmina (administrative district) in Wejherowo County, Pomeranian Voivodeship, in northern Poland.

The gmina contains part of the protected area called Tricity Landscape Park.

Villages
Gmina Szemud contains the villages and settlements of Bagielnica, Będargowo, Bojano, Bożanka, Czarna Dąbrowa, Czarna Góra, Częstkowo, Dębnik, Dębowa, Dobrzewino, Donimierz, Gapionka, Gęsia Krzywda, Głazica, Grabowiec, Jeleńska Huta, Kamień, Karczemki, Kieleńska Huta, Kielno, Koleczkowo, Koleczkowski Młyn, Kowalewo, Łebieńska Huta, Łebno, Łekno, Leśno, Mały Donimierz, Moczydła, Mrówczy Zamek, Nowa Karczma, Przetoczyno, Psale, Rębiska, Rosochy, Szemud, Szemudzka Huta, Szopa, Warzno, Zęblewo and Zęblewski Młyn.

Neighbouring gminas
Gmina Szemud is bordered by the city of Gdynia and by the gminas of Kartuzy, Linia, Luzino, Przodkowo, Wejherowo and Żukowo.

References
Polish official population figures 2006

Szemud
Wejherowo County